Anolis brooksi is a species of lizard in the family Dactyloidae. The species is found in Panama.

References

Anoles
Reptiles of Panama
Endemic fauna of Panama
Reptiles described in 1923
Taxa named by Thomas Barbour